Bathing in the New Economy is the fifth album and first EP released from the band emmet swimming. It was re-released in 2009 with bonus tracks.

Track listing (2003 Screaming Goddess release)

Track listing (2009 Screaming Goddess release)

Personnel
Todd Watts - Vocals, Guitar
Erik Wenberg - Guitar, backing vocals
Luke Michel - Bass
Derrick Decker - Drums
Tamer Eid - Drums
Antonio Pacheco - Engineer
Bev Stanton - Engineer
Mark Williams - Engineer

References

Emmet Swimming albums
2003 EPs